The 2014 Copa Sevilla was a professional tennis tournament played on clay courts. It was the 17th edition of the tournament which was part of the 2014 ATP Challenger Tour. It took place in Seville, Spain, between 8 and 13 September 2014.

Singles main-draw entrants

Seeds

 1 Rankings are as of September 1, 2014.

Other entrants
The following players received wildcards into the singles main draw:
  Agustin Boje-Ordonez 
  Pedro Dominguez Alonso
  Ricardo Ojeda Lara
  David Vega Hernandez

The following players received entry from the qualifying draw:
  Frederico Gil 
  Albert Alcaraz Ivorra
  Eduard Esteve Lobato
  Michal Schmid

Champions

Singles

  Pablo Carreño def.  Taro Daniel, 6–4, 6–1

Doubles

  Antal van der Duim /  Boy Westerhof def.  James Cluskey /  Jesse Huta Galung, 7–6(7–3), 6–4

External links
Official Website

 
2014
2014 ATP Challenger Tour
2014 in Spanish tennis
September 2014 sports events in Europe